Osamu Takechi (born 1914, date of death unknown) was a Japanese field hockey player. He competed in the men's tournament at the 1936 Summer Olympics.

References

External links
 

1914 births
Year of death missing
Place of birth missing
Japanese male field hockey players
Olympic field hockey players of Japan
Field hockey players at the 1936 Summer Olympics